Sidra Stich is an American art historian, museum curator, and travel writer based in San Francisco.

Education and career
She completed her undergraduate degree and earned a Masters in Visual Arts Education from Harvard University and a Ph.D in Art History from UC Berkeley where she wrote her dissertation on Surrealism and Picasso.

After finishing graduate school, she taught at Washington University in St. Louis. She then became chief curator of the Berkeley Art Museum.  She has also held teaching positions at Stanford University, UC Berkeley, Washington University in St. Louis, University of San Francisco, and Mills College.

She was awarded research fellowships at the National Gallery, Washington, DC, Smithsonian American Art Museum, the Clayman Institute for Gender Research at Stanford University, and The Berlin Academy. She made a career decision to travel and write about modern art rather than return to teaching or as a curating.

Writing
Stich has produced a series of informational guides to art and architecture. She has made guides to France (1999); Britain and Ireland (2000); Spain (2003); San Francisco (2003); Paris (2003); Northern Italy (2005); and London (2005).

Books
 Made in U.S.A. An Americanization in Modern Art, the '50s and '60s
  Yves Klein (Distributed Art publishers, 1994)
  Anxious Visions: Surrealist Art 
  Art Sites London: The Indispensable Guide To Contemporary Art Architecture Design 
  Art Sites Paris 
  Art Sites San Francisco: The Indispensable Guide To Contemporary Art Architecture Design 
  Spain: Contemporary Art + Architecture Handbook 
  Britain & Ireland: Contemporary Art + Architecture Handbook 
  France: Contemporary Art + Architecture Handbook 
  Art-Sites San Francisco: The Indispensable Guide to Contemporary Art-Architecture-Design

Fellowships
She received fellowships at The American Academy in Berlin, at Stanford Institute on Women and Gender, at the Smithsonian American Art Museum, at the Getty Museum Leadership Institute, and at the Center for Advanced Study in the Visual Arts at the National Gallery of Art.

References

External links
 

American art historians
Women art historians
21st-century travel writers
American women travel writers
American travel writers
Harvard Graduate School of Education alumni
Writers from the San Francisco Bay Area
Living people
University of California, Berkeley alumni
Year of birth missing (living people)
21st-century American women
American women curators
American curators
Washington University in St. Louis faculty